Naranarayan is a Sanskrit term meaning the combination of the human and the supreme being, here Vishnu. In Sanskrit, nara means human being and narayan means Narayana, another name for Vishnu. In Mahabharata, Arjuna has been identified with nara and Krishna with Narayana.

 Nara-Narayana, the twin brother incarnation of Vishnu.
 Naranarayan of Bhurishrestha, the king of Bhurishrestha.
 Nara Narayan, the second and the last Koch ruler of the undivided Kamata kingdom.